Licininae is a subfamily of beetles in the family Carabidae, containing the following genera:

 Acanthoodes Basilewsky, 1953
 Actodus Alluaud, 1915
 Acutosternus Lecordier & Girard, 1988
 Adelopomorpha Heller, 1916
 Anatrichis LeConte, 1853
 Atrotus Peringuey, 1896
 Badister Clairville, 1806
 Brachyodes Jeannel, 1949
 Callistomimus Chaudoir, 1872
 Callistus Bonelli, 1810
 Camptotoma Reiche, 1843
 Chaetocrepis Chaudoir, 1856
 Chaetogenys Emden, 1958
 Chlaenius Bonelli, 1810
 Colpostoma Semenov, 1889 
 Coptocarpus Chaudoir, 1857
 Cuneipectus Sloane, 1907
 Dercylinus Chaudoir, 1883
 Dercylus Castelnau de Laporte, 1832
 Derostichus Motschulsky, 1859 
 Dicaelindus W.S. MacLeay, 1825
 Dicaelus Bonelli, 1813
 Dicrochile Guerin-Meneville, 1846
 Dilonchus Andrewes, 1936
 Diplocheila Brulle, 1834
 Eccoptomenus Chaudoir, 1850
 Ectenognathus Murray, 1958
 Epomis Bonelli, 1810
 Eurygnathus Wollaston, 1854 
 Eutogeneius Solier, 1849
 Evolenes LeConte, 1853
 Geobaenus Dejean, 1829
 Harpaglossus Motschulsky, 1858
 Holcocoleus Chaudoir, 1883
 Hololeius LaFerte-Senectere, 1851
 Holosoma Semenov, 1889
 Hoplolenus La Ferte-Senectere, 1851
 Hormacrus Sloane, 1898
 Lachnocrepis LeConte, 1853
 Lacordairia Castelnau, 1867
 Lestignathus Erichson, 1842
 Licinus Latreille, 1802 
 Lobatodes Basilewsky, 1956
 Lonchosternus LaFerte-Senectere, 1851
 Macroprotus Chaudoir, 1878
 Martyr Semenov & Znojko, 1929
 Megaloodes Lesne, 1896
 Melanchiton Andrewes, 1940 
 Melanchrous Andrewes, 1940
 Microferonia Blackburn, 1890
 Microodes Jeannel, 1949
 Microzargus Sciaky & Facchini, 1997
 Miltodes Andrewes, 1922
 Nanodiodes Bousquet, 1996
 Neoodes Basilewsky, 1953
 Omestes Andrewes, 1933 
 Oodes Bonelli, 1810
 Oodinus Motschulsky, 1864
 Orthocerodus Basilewsky, 1946
 Parachlaenius Kolbe, 1894
 Perissostomus Alluaud, 1930
 Physolaesthus Chaudoir, 1850
 Platylytron MacLeay, 1873
 Polychaetus Chaudoir, 1882
 Prionognathus LaFerte-Senectere, 1851
 Procletodema Peringuey, 1899
 Procletus Peringuey, 1896 
 Protopidius Basilewsky, 1949
 Pseudosphaerodes Jeannel, 1949
 Rhopalomelus Boheman, 1848 
 Siagonyx MacLeay, 1873
 Simous Chaudoir, 1882
 Sphaerodes Bates, 1886
 Sphaerodinus Jeannel, 1949
 Sphodroschema Alluaud, 1930
 Stenocrepis Chaudoir, 1857
 Stenoodes Basilewsky, 1953
 Stuhlmannium Kolbe, 1894
 Systolocranius Chaudoir, 1857
 Thryptocerus Chaudoir, 1878
 Vachinius Casale, 1984
 Zargus Wollaston, 1854

References

 
Carabidae subfamilies